Cristina Marin (born 10 December 1981 in Constanţa, Romania) is a Romanian aerobic gymnast. She won three world championship medals (two gold and one bronze) and seven European championships medals (four gold, two silver and one bronze).

References

External links

1981 births
Living people
Sportspeople from Constanța
Romanian aerobic gymnasts
Female aerobic gymnasts
Medalists at the Aerobic Gymnastics World Championships